Novodmitriyevka is a rural locality (a khutor) in Maryevskoye Rural Settlement, Olkhovatsky District, Voronezh Oblast, Russia. The population was 91 as of 2010.

Geography 
Novodmitriyevka is located 24 km northwest of Olkhovatka (the district's administrative centre) by road. Limarev is the nearest rural locality.

References 

Rural localities in Olkhovatsky District